Buntong is a state constituency in Perak, Malaysia. It is located in the Ipoh Barat federal constituency and is currently represented in the Perak State Legislative Assembly by Sivasubramaniam A/L Athinarayanan from the PBM.

Representation history

Polling Districts 
According to the federal gazette issued on 31 October 2022, the Buntong constituency is divided into 9 polling districts.

Demographics 

Buntong has the greatest percentage of Indian voters among state constituencies in Malaysia, followed by Sentosa, Klang. Its current voter composition is 52% Indians, 42% Chinese, 6% Muslim-Malays and 1% Other Ethnicities.

Election Results

References

Sources
https://web.archive.org/web/20190328131558/http://www.federalgazette.agc.gov.my/outputp/pub_20160429_P.U.(B)197.pdf

Perak state constituencies